What Marx Really Meant is a 1934 book by G. D. H. Cole that attempted to modernize Marxism for the era since Karl Marx's 1883 death.

See also 

 Why Marx Was Right, a 2011 book that similarly modernized Marxism for its own era

Bibliography 

 
 
 
 
 
 
 

1934 non-fiction books
English-language books
Books about Marxism